Werner J. Blau is a Chair of Physics and Advanced Materials at Trinity College Dublin and AMBER Center. He is Honorary Professor in the Chemistry Department of East China University of Science and Technology; Visiting Honorary Professor, Northwest University, Xi’an, China; and was Honoured Professor and China National High-end Foreign Expert at SIOM, Chinese Academy of Science.

Blau is a specialist in carbon nanotubes. His most cited papers are in this subject:
Coleman JN, Khan U, Blau WJ, Gun’ko YK. Small but strong: a review of the mechanical properties of carbon nanotube–polymer composites. Carbon. 2006 Aug 1;44(9):1624-52.(Cited 4494 times, according to Google Scholar  ) 
De S, Higgins TM, Lyons PE, Doherty EM, Nirmalraj PN, Blau WJ, Boland JJ, Coleman JN. Silver nanowire networks as flexible, transparent, conducting films: extremely high DC to optical conductivity ratios. ACS Nano. 2009 Jul 28;3(7):1767-74. (Cited 640 times, according to Google Scholar.)  
 Curran SA, Ajayan PM, Blau WJ, Carroll DL, Coleman JN, Dalton AB, Davey AP, Drury A, McCarthy B, Maier S, Strevens A. A composite from poly (m‐phenylenevinylene‐co‐2, 5‐dioctoxy‐p‐phenylenevinylene) and carbon nanotubes: A novel material for molecular optoelectronics. Advanced Materials. 1998 Oct;10(14):1091-3. (Cited 851 times, according to Google Scholar.)

References 

Year of birth missing (living people)
Living people
Place of birth missing (living people)
Nationality missing
Academics of Trinity College Dublin
Academic staff of East China University of Science and Technology